Geschichte und Region/Storia e regione is an Italian academic journal established in 1992 by the Arbeitsgruppe Geschichte und Region/Storia e regione, based in Bolzano (South Tyrol). It is a German-Italian bilingual and peer-reviewed publication.

Further reading 
 Hans Heiss, "Geschichte und Region/Soria e regione. Eine Zwischenbilanz", in Geschichte und Region/Storia e regione 21, 2012, No. 1–2, pp. 163–171.
 Hannes Obermair, "Umbrüche – Übergange – Chancen. Landesgeschichtliche Zeitschriften im Raum Tirol-Südtirol-Trentino und in Italien", in Medien des begrenzten Raumes. Landesgeschichtliche Zeitschriften im 19. und 20. Jahrhundert (Forschungen zur Regionalgeschichte 73), ed. by Thomas Küster, Paderborn et al. Ferdinand Schöningh 2013. , pp. 265–281.

External links
Official Website of Geschichte und Region/Storia e regione

History journals
Biannual journals
Publications established in 1992
German-language journals
Italian-language journals